Rong'an (Mandarin: 茸安乡) is a township in Ngawa County, Ngawa Tibetan and Qiang Autonomous Prefecture, Sichuan, China. In 2010, Rong'an Township had a total population of 2,854: 1,396 males and 1,458 females: 862 aged under 14, 1,764 aged between 15 and 65 and 228 aged over 65.

References 
 

 

 
Township-level divisions of Sichuan
Ngawa  Tibetan and Qiang Autonomous Prefecture